Marwan Mabrouk Mansour, sometimes referred to as Marwaan Mabrouk Mansour,() (born 15 December 1989) is a Libyan footballer. He currently plays for Al-Ittihad Tripoli in the Libyan Premier League.

Career
Mabrouk began playing football for Libyan Premier League club Olomby, including their run in the 2004 Libyan Super Cup, where the club lost the final to Al-Ittihad. He joined Al-Ittihad in 2009, and has been a fixture in their CAF Champions League and CAF Confederation Cup matches. Mabrouk helped Ittihad win its ninth consecutive Libyan Super Cup in 2010. He also played for the club in the 2010 CAF Confederation Cup, helping the club reach the semifinals.

He has three caps for the Libyan national football team.

References

External links

1989 births
Living people
Libyan footballers
Libya international footballers
Al-Ittihad Club (Tripoli) players
2012 Africa Cup of Nations players
Competitors at the 2005 Mediterranean Games
Mediterranean Games bronze medalists for Libya
Association football midfielders
Mediterranean Games medalists in football
Olympic Azzaweya SC players
Libyan Premier League players